Pepper Gowt Plot, also known as Rowlands Marsh, was a hamlet and small tract of extra-parochial land, created when the River Witham was straightened in the early 19th century, and lies about  north of the town of Boston, Lincolnshire, England, and immediately south of Anton's Gowt.

It was a created a civil parish in 1858, when the principal land owner was John Rowland. In 1906 it was abolished to enlarge the parish of Skirbeck. In turn, Skirbeck civil parish was abolished in 1932 to enlarge the parishes of Boston and Fishtoft, Today the area is known as Witham Marsh, and lies within Fishtoft civil parish. At the time of the 2011 census the population is included in the civil parish of Holland Fen with Brothertoft.

References

Hamlets in Lincolnshire
Former civil parishes in Lincolnshire
Borough of Boston